Eleanor Chavez (born June 30, 1953) is an American politician serving as a member of the New Mexico House of Representatives for the 26th district. She previously represented the 13th district in the House from 2009 to 2013.

Early life and education 
Chavez was born in Las Cruces, New Mexico. She earned a Bachelor of Arts from the University of Washington and a Master of Social Work from the University of Washington School of Social Work.

Career 
After earning her master's degree, Chavez returned to New Mexico, where she worked as a community organizer. From 1997 to 2008, she was the director of the National Union of Hospital and Health Care Employee. In 2008, she was elected to the New Mexico House of Representatives for the 13th district. In 2012, she opted not to seek re-election and instead run for the New Mexico Senate. In the 2012 Democratic primary, Chavez placed second after incumbent Michael Padilla.

In 2014, Chavez was elected to the New Mexico Public Education Commission. She declined to seek re-election in 2016. After leaving office, Chavez  resumed working for the National Union of Hospital and Health Care Employee as chapter director. In 2022, she was again elected to the New Mexico House of Representatives.

References 

Living people
1953 births
Hispanic and Latino American state legislators in New Mexico
Hispanic and Latino American women in politics
People from Las Cruces, New Mexico
University of Washington alumni
University of Washington School of Social Work alumni
Democratic Party members of the New Mexico House of Representatives
Women state legislators in New Mexico
21st-century American women